Nagmachon is a heavily armoured infantry fighting vehicle fielded by the Israel Defense Forces. The Nagmachon evolved from the NagmaSho't APC, which in turn was based on Centurion Sho't hulls from the 1970s and 1980s. The vehicle carries thick belly armour designed to withstand mine-blasts and mountings on the front hull for various engineering devices such as mine plows, mine rollers and dozer blades. In addition to its belly armour and the relatively heavy armour of the Centurion hull, the Nagmachon also carries explosive reactive armour to counter HEAT rounds, such as rocket propelled grenades.

Early Nagmachons were equipped with three armoured shields to give soldiers firing the mounted FN general-purpose machine guns some degree of protection from small arms fire. Later Nagmachons were fitted with a distinctive raised superstructure, sometimes referred to as a 'doghouse'.  The raised superstructure and increased mine protection have made the Nagmachon an ideal platform for counter-insurgency and urban operations, seeing much use in the al-Aqsa Intifada within the disputed territories and southern Lebanon in 2006. It is often used as an engineering vehicle and a carrier for sappers, although its main role has been to carry infantry.

See also
 Nakpadon
 Puma armored engineering vehicle
 IDF Achzarit
 Namer

External links
 Nagmachon + Sho't Family, accessed 22 February 2023
 israeli-weapons.com
 Global Security

Armoured personnel carriers of Israel
Tracked armoured personnel carriers
Military vehicles introduced in the 1980s

he:נגמ"שים כבדים בצה"ל#נגמחו"ן